Three Women (Egyptian Arabic: ٣ نساء, translit: Thalath Nisa) is an Egyptian film released in 1968. It tells three separate stories about three women, featuring Sabah, Huda Sultan and Mervat Amin as the three women. The film is written by Ihsan Abdel Quddous and stars Salah Zulfikar, Ahmed Ramzy and Shoukry Sarhan.

The first story: Hana

Plot 
Hana (Mervat Amin), an air hostess, loves Adel (Salah Zulfikar), the architect, but she meets Sami (Samir Shamas), the Lebanese pilot, and she also falls in love with him. The choice is settled.

Cast 

 Salah Zulfikar: (Adel)
 Mervat Amin: (Hana)
 Samir Chamas: (Sami)
 Abdel Moneim Ibrahim: (Abdul Hamid Zuhdi)
 Ragaa El Geddawy: (Hana's colleague)
 Nadia Seif Al-Nasr: (Hana's colleague)
 Alia Abdel Moneim: (Hana's mother)
 Atef Makram: (Adel is Hana's brother)

Staff 

 Directed by: Mahmoud Zulfikar
 Screenplay and dialogue: Mohamed Abu Yousef
 Director of Photography: Waheed Farid

The second story: Tawheeda

Plot 
Tawheeda, a beautiful widow (Huda Sultan), loves Youssef (Shukri Sarhan), an employee of the Probate Council, and she turns to him to finish her pension procedures.  But he does not care about her because he is married and has children.  She resorts to one of the charlatans in order to make a puzzle in order to relate to her and love her.  But they were swindlers who drain her money and get arrested.  Youssef goes to her and thinks that he is coming to marry her, but he tells her that he is asking her for a loan to treat his sick wife, so her hopes collapse and are shattered after everything she did for him.

Cast 

 Huda Sultan: (Tawhida)
 Shoukry Sarhan: (Youssef)
 Muhammad Reda: (The teacher is serious)
 Tawfiq Al-Daqn: (The Wizard)
 Malak El Gamal: (Prophecy - mother of Tawheeda)
 Aliyah Abdel Moneim: (Youssef's wife)
 El Deif Ahmed: (assistant of the charlatan)
 Samir Ghanem: (One of the charlatans)
 George Sidhom: (one of the charlatans)

staff 

 Directed by: Salah Abu Seif
 Screenplay and dialogue: Mohamed Mostafa Sami
 Director of Photography: Ali Hassan

song 

 Oh, six ships, oh buoy (Al-Zar)
 Performed by: Huda Sultan
 Written by Hussein El-Sayed
 composed by Sayed Mekawy

The third story: Shams

Plot 
A singer in Lebanon's cabarets falls in love with Fathi and has a relationship with her, but he lives in confusion because of her sitting with customers and feels jealous, so he goes to her in the cabaret to sit with him like any customer, despite warning him that she loves him for his person and not for his money.  But she treats him as a customer and leaves him and leaves as usual with the customers of the shop and decides to stay away from him because he did not understand and did not appreciate her love.

Cast 

 Sabah: (Shams)
 Ahmed Ramzy: (Fathi)

staff 

 Directed by: Henry Barakat
 Screenplay and dialogue: Mohamed Abu Yousef
 Director of Photography: Ibrahim Shamat

song 

 My love, who threw me
 Performed by: Sabah
 Written and composed by the Rahbani Brothers

Film staff 

 Written by: Ihsan Abdel Quddous
 Produced by: Ramses Naguib
 Distributed by: The Egyptian General Organization for Cinema
 Editing: Hussein Afifi
 Soundtrack: Fouad El Zahery

References

External links 
 
 Three Women on elCinema

1968 films
1960s Arabic-language films
20th-century Egyptian films
Films shot in Egypt